The 1999 Intercontinental Final was the twenty-first running of the Intercontinental Final and was the second last qualifying stage for Motorcycle speedway riders to qualify for the 2000 Speedway Grand Prix series. The Final was run on 18 July at the Poole Stadium in Poole, England.

Intercontinental Final
 18 July
  Poole, Poole Stadium
 First place to 2000 Speedway Grand Prix
 Riders 2-7 plus 1 reserve to GP Challenge

References

1999
World Individual